HMS Teazer was an  destroyer which served with the Royal Navy during World War I. The destroyer was launched in April 1917 and, on trial, proved to be one of the fastest afloat, exceeding . The destroyer also took part in operations off the coast of Heligoland with a flying boat on a lighter, although the aircraft failed to take off. After the war, Teazer was kept in reserve until being sold to be broken up in 1931 following the signing of the London Naval Treaty that limited total destroyer tonnage.

Design and development

Teazer was one of two  destroyers ordered by the British Admiralty from Thornycroft in December 1915 as part of the Seventh War Construction Programme alongside . The ships differed from the six preceding  built by the yard in having all geared turbines and the aft gun being raised on a bandstand.

Displacement was  normal and  full load. Three funnels were fitted, the centre one larger in diameter than the others.

Armament consisted of three QF 4in Mk IV guns on the ship's centreline. One was mounted on the forecastle, one aft and one between the second and third funnels. The ship also mounted a single 2-pounder (40 mm) pom-pom anti-aircraft gun for air defence and four  torpedoes in two twin rotating mounts. The vessel had a complement of 82 officers and ratings.

Construction and career
Laid down in March 1916, the vessel was launched on 21 April 1917. Teazer was commissioned in July 1917 and joined the Harwich Force, serving as part of the Tenth Destroyer Flotilla.

Teazer was one of the destroyers from the Harwich Force that patrolled the outer perimeter. At the same time, the Navy was looking at alternative ways of attacking the Germans, particularly the fast but short range Thornycroft Coastal Motor Boats and Curtis Large American flying boats. A lighter was developed that could be towed by destroyers, taking the faster craft close to the enemy. On 10 August, Thisbe, towing a flying boat on a lighter and accompanied by six Coastal Motor Boats, joined a fleet of four light cruisers and thirteen destroyers to sail for Heligoland and attack German shipping. Initially, the assignment was not a success as the aircraft failed to take off and the boats were all sunk or interned, but subsequently one of the aircraft launched by one of the other destroyers shot down the Zeppelin LZ 100. The vessel also took part in one of the last operations of the war. On 1 October, Teazer was one of a five destroyers, led by flotilla leader , that identified that German forces had withdrawn from Flanders.

After the armistice of 11 November 1918 and the end of war, the destroyer remained with the Tenth Destroyer Flotilla. Recommissioned on 16 October 1919 and transferred to Devonport, the vessel was reduced to reserve on 11 August 1920. Teazer was retired following the signing of the London Naval Treaty which limited total destroyer tonnage in the Navy. The vessel was sold on 6 February 1931 to Cashmore of Newport and broken up.

Pennant numbers

References

Citations

Bibliography

 
 
 
 
 
 
 
 
 
 

1917 ships
R-class destroyers (1916)
Ships built in Southampton
World War I destroyers of the United Kingdom
Ships built by John I. Thornycroft & Company